The Best of Suede is a compilation album by English alternative rock band Suede, released on 1 November 2010.

Overview
The compilation spans two discs and it is a mix of singles, album tracks and B-sides compiled by lead singer Brett Anderson. Disc one includes all of the band's singles excluding "Positivity" and "Attitude". Disc two includes album tracks from the band's first three albums as well as seven B-sides from disc one of Sci-Fi Lullabies. Both Anderson and former guitarist Bernard Butler were involved in the remastering of the tracks with Chris Potter. The cover artwork is designed by Elizabeth Peyton. Unlike previous hits compilation Singles, this best-of collection was fully endorsed by the band. According to Anderson, it was led by the band: "...that was kind of the whole point of this compilation... the 2 CDs. The first CD we picked, and then the second CD is kind of fan favourites in a way... the fans' favourites and the band’s favourites... a bit more obscure songs and lots of B-sides."

Reception
The collection charted at no. 31 on the UK Albums Chart, on first-week sales of 7,663.

Track listing

References

External links

The Best of Suede at YouTube (streamed copy where licensed)

Suede (band) compilation albums
2010 compilation albums
Universal Music Group compilation albums